Yucca Airstrip  is a private-use airport located 17 miles (27 km) north of the central business district of Mercury, in Nye County, Nevada, United States. The airport is located on the Nevada Test Site and is owned by the United States Department of Energy. On the sectional chart it is depicted as an unverified airstrip.

History 
The airport was the staging area for Shot Badger, a test of the Upshot–Knothole Series of nuclear test shots on April 18, 1953.

Facilities 

 Runway 01/19: 4,990 x 75 ft (1,521 x 23 m), surface: asphalt
 Runway 14/32: 9,000 x 200 ft (2,743 x 61 m), surface: salt

The asphalt runway was constructed in 2002 as part of an unmanned aerial vehicle test facility.

References 

Great Circle Mapper: UCC/KUCC - Mercury, Nevada (Yucca Airstrip)

External links 

Airports in Nevada
Buildings and structures in Nye County, Nevada
Nevada Test Site
Transportation in Nye County, Nevada
Secret places in the United States